The Conservative Club, also known as The Scottish Conservative Club, was an Edinburgh Gentlemen's club founded in the late 1870s, and from 1880 located at 112 Princes Street. As the name implies, the club was politically aligned to the Conservatives.

History
In 1880, the club moved to a club house on Princes Street designed by Arthur Colville. It opened officially on the 1st February 1884. The new clubhouse had an elaborate carved timber stair turning round a 2-storey arcade, against 3 stained glass windows by James Ballantyne and Son.

In 1978, department store Debenhams took over the property, as well as The Scottish Liberal Club next door, and knocked through turning both into a department store.

Present use
In 2021, the clubhouse, along with the former clubhouse of The Scottish Liberal Club, received planning permission for conversion into a hotel.

See also
 Conservative Club

References

Clubs and societies in Edinburgh
Organisations based in Edinburgh
New Town, Edinburgh